Eljas ( or ) is a municipality (municipio) located in the province of Cáceres, Extremadura, Spain. According to the 2008 census (INE), the municipality has  inhabitants.

The local linguistic variety is the so-called Fala language, different from both Spanish and Portuguese, but closer to the second.

References

Municipalities in the Province of Cáceres